Two Fisted Justice is a 1943 American Western film directed by Robert Emmett Tansey. The film is the nineteenth in Monogram Pictures' "Range Busters" series, and it stars John "Dusty" King as Dusty,  "Davy" Sharpe and Max "Alibi" Terhune, with Gwen Gaze, Joel Davis and John Elliott.

Cast
 John 'Dusty' King as 'Dusty' King 
 David Sharpe as Dave Sharpe 
 Max Terhune as 'Alibi' Terhune 
 Elmer as Elmer, Alibi's Dummy 
 Gwen Gaze as Joan Hodgins 
 Joel Davis as Sonny Hodgins 
 John Elliott as Uncle Will Hodgins 
 Charles King as Trigger Farley, Henchman 
 George Chesebro as Decker, Gang-Boss 
 Frank Ellis as Harve, Henchman 
 Cecil Weston as Stage Passenger 
 Hal Price as Sam, Grocery Man

See also
The Range Busters series:
 The Range Busters (1940)
 Trailing Double Trouble (1940)
 West of Pinto Basin (1940)
 Trail of the Silver Spurs (1941)
 The Kid's Last Ride (1941)
 Tumbledown Ranch in Arizona (1941)
 Wrangler's Roost (1941)
 Fugitive Valley (1941)
 Saddle Mountain Roundup (1941)
 Tonto Basin Outlaws (1941)
 Underground Rustlers (1941)
 Thunder River Feud (1942)
 Rock River Renegades (1942)
 Boot Hill Bandits (1942)
 Texas Trouble Shooters (1942)
 Arizona Stage Coach (1942)
 Texas to Bataan (1942)
 Trail Riders (1942)
 Two Fisted Justice (1943)
 Haunted Ranch (1943)
 Land of Hunted Men (1943)
 Cowboy Commandos (1943)
 Black Market Rustlers (1943)
 Bullets and Saddles (1943)

References

Bibliography
 Bernard A. Drew. Motion Picture Series and Sequels: A Reference Guide. Routledge, 2013.

External links
 

1943 films
1943 Western (genre) films
1940s English-language films
American Western (genre) films
Films directed by Robert Emmett Tansey
Monogram Pictures films
American black-and-white films
Range Busters
1940s American films